Little Yemen is an ethnic enclave located in the eastern half of Bronx, New York in Morris Park. It is wedged in-between Van Nest and Pelham Parkway. The heart of the neighborhood is located on White Plains Road at Rhinelander Avenue. 

The Yemeni American Community started growing in large numbers after the war started in Yemen in 2014. Yahay Obeid, Outreach Liaison for the Bronx Muslim Center worked with Google and a journalist to change the name of the area to Little Yemen. 

There are over 500 Yemeni owned businesses within a one mile radius of Little Yemen, most are Deli and Groceries. Previously, the area was mostly Italian and Latino.

The Yemeni American Day Parade has been held annually in Little Yemen since 2019. The first Yemeni American Day Parade drew over 3,000 people, including visitors from numerous states. 

The area contains several hookah cafes, Yemeni supermarkets and Yemeni restaurants and pharmacies that surround the intersection. It is however not listed in any records as an independent neighborhood and is more of a vernacular name.

References

Ethnic enclaves in New York (state)
Morris Park, Bronx